The Maracanazo of the Chilean team (also known as Condorazo or Bengalazo) was an incident that happened during the football match between Brazil and Chile at the Maracanã Stadium in Rio de Janeiro on 3 September 1989, in which Chilean goalkeeper Roberto Rojas pretended to be injured by a flare thrown by Brazilian fans. The incident is considered by historians and football experts as one of the most shameful events in world football. The incident resulted in Chile being banned from qualifying for the 1994 World Cup, and ended Rojas' career, as he was banned for life.

Background

For the 1990 FIFA World Cup, the South American Football Confederation (CONMEBOL) received 3.5 berths (including Argentina who already qualified as title holders). The other teams were grouped into three groups. The winners of Groups 1 and 3 qualified directly for the World Cup, while the winner of Group 2 had to play an intercontinental play-off against the winner of Oceania's qualifying. Chile, Venezuela and Brazil were assigned to Group 3.

In the qualifiers, Chile beat Venezuela 3–1 in Caracas, drew 1–1 with Brazil in Santiago and beat Venezuela 5–0 in Mendoza, Argentina as FIFA had banned Chile from playing at home after crowd trouble in the match against Brazil. With both teams due to play each other, Chile and Brazil were leading the group with 5 points each although Brazil were top on goal difference. This meant Chile needed to beat Brazil to qualify.

The match 
After a goalless first half, Careca of Brazil scored the only goal in the 49th minute. In the 67th minute, Chilean goalkeeper Roberto Rojas fell to the ground, bleeding, pretending to be hurt by a flare thrown by Brazilian fans.

Immediately, Chilean players and officials, led by captain Fernando Astengo, left the pitch in protest, while Argentinian referee Juan Carlos Loustau unsuccessfully tried to convince them to continue with the game. While Rojas was being treated, Patricio Yáñez made an obscene gesture to the Brazilian fans by grabbing his genitals. This gesture was later known in Chile as Pato Yáñez.

The next day, television images and several photos revealed that the flare thrown by Brazilian fans did not hit Rojas, but landed just over a metre away. With that evidence, CONMEBOL managers discredited Rojas' account of an "attack" by Brazilian fans, casting doubt on the origin of his injury, which showed no signs of burning or gunpowder traces but seemed to have been caused by a blade. Brazilian police had meanwhile identified and arrested the fan that threw the flare onto the pitch: a 24-year-old fan named Rosenery Mello do Nascimento, known later as Fogueteira do Maracanã (Firecracker of Maracanã).

As the investigation progressed, it became evident to CONMEBOL managers that Rojas' injury was not caused by an object thrown from the stands. After questioning, Rojas confessed to having cut himself with a razor blade hidden in one of his gloves to fake an attack by Brazilian fans, and that Chilean coach Orlando Aravena had asked Rojas and team doctor Daniel Rodríguez to stay on the pitch to force a scandal, with the purpose of nullifying the result of the game and either forcing a third match on neutral soil or disqualifying Brazil from the competition in favour of Chile.

Ten days after the game, FIFA decided that Rojas should be banned "in perpetuity" from professional football (the ban was lifted in 2001) and Chile would be barred from the qualifiers for the 1994 FIFA World Cup (which was due to abandoning the match, not Rojas' simulation). In addition, FIFA ruled that the game would be deemed to have been won by Brazil by walkover with an official score of 2–0. In addition, Sergio Stoppel (president of the Football Federation of Chile), Orlando Aravena (team coach), Fernando Astengo (team captain) and Daniel Rodríguez (team's doctor) among others, were all punished by FIFA for their roles.

Over the following days, there were incidents in front of the Brazilian embassy in Chile after Chilean media had reported the version provided by Rojas and Stoppel. Sports magazines (specially Minuto 90) even suggested a conspiracy by João Havelange to secure Brazil's qualification.

Match details

See also
Copa Teixeira

References

External links
 Information about the incident in the Chilean Press Museum (in Spanish)
 EPA – Veinte años después, el 'Maracanazo' de Rojas aún está vivo en Chile (in Spanish)
 A 25 años del 'Maracanazo': Testigos de la gran mentira (in Spanish)
 FIFA lifts ban on Chilean goalkeeper

1990 FIFA World Cup qualification (CONMEBOL)
Chile national football team matches
1989
FIFA World Cup controversies
FIFA World Cup qualification matches
Sports scandals in Brazil
Cheating in sports
September 1989 sports events in South America
Nicknamed sporting events